Paleoseismology looks at geologic sediments and rocks, for signs of ancient earthquakes. It is used to supplement seismic monitoring, for the calculation of seismic hazard.  Paleoseismology is usually restricted to geologic regimes that have undergone continuous sediment creation for the last few thousand years, such as swamps, lakes, river beds and shorelines.

In this typical example, a trench is dug in an active sedimentation regime.  Evidence of thrust faulting can be seen in the walls of the trench.  It becomes a matter of deducting the relative age of each fault, by cross-cutting patterns.  The faults can be dated in absolute terms, if there is dateable carbon, or human artifacts.

Many notable discoveries have been made using the techniques of paleoseismology.  For example, there is a common misconception that having many smaller earthquakes can somehow 'relieve' a major fault such as the San Andreas Fault, and reduce the chance of a major earthquake.  It is now known (using paleoseismology) that nearly all the movement of the fault takes place with extremely large earthquakes.  All of these seismic events (with a moment magnitude of over 8), leave some sort of trace in the sedimentation record.

Another famous example involves the megathrust earthquakes of the Pacific Northwest.  It was thought for some time that there was low seismic hazard in the region because relatively few modern earthquakes have been recorded.  It was thought that the Cascadia subduction zone was merely sliding in a benign manner.

All of these comforting notions were shattered by paleoseismology studies showing evidence of extremely large earthquakes (the most recent being in 1700), along with historical tsunami records.  In effect, the subduction zone under British Columbia, Washington, Oregon, and far northern California, is perfectly normal, being extremely hazardous in the long term, with the capability of generating coastal tsunamis of several hundred feet in height at the coast. These are caused by the interface between the subducted sea floor stressing the overlaying coastal soils in compression. Periodically a slip will occur which causes the coastal portion to reduce in elevation and thrust toward the west, leading to tsunamis in the central and eastern north Pacific Ocean (with several hours of warning) and a reflux of water toward the coastal shore, with little time for residents to escape.

An educational excavation

Paleoseismic trenching
Paleoseismic investigations are commonly performed through trenching studies in which a trench is dug and a geologist logs the geological attributes of the rock layers. Trenching studies are especially relevant to seismically active regions, such as many parts of California.

See also 
 Archaeoseismology
 Paleotempestology
 Seismite

References

Sources
James P. McCalpin (2009) Paleoseismology (2nd Edition),  Academic Press, 
James P. McCalpin (1996) Paleoseismology,  Elsevier,

External links
 Paleoseismicity.org - Online platform for paleoseismologists
 INQUA Paleoseismology/ web site of the International Focus Group on Paleoseismology and Active tectonics. TERPRO Commission, International Union for Quaternary Research

Historical geology
Fields of seismology